Dandry Mire Viaduct, (or Dandrymire Viaduct), is a railway viaduct on the Settle & Carlisle line in Cumbria, England. When the Settle & Carlisle line was being built, the traversing of Dandry Mire was to have been by use of an embankment, but the bog swallowed all of the material poured into it, so a trench was dug instead, and a viaduct constructed.

History
Work started on this part of the line in 1871 as part of the second contract let, with the original intent of crossing Dandry Mire Moss on an embankment rather than a viaduct. The continual wet weather combined with the boggy nature of Dandry Mire, combined to prompt the builders to try a different approach. 

John Sanders, the main architect for the structures on the line, designed a viaduct, and J S Crossley was the chief engineer during the build period. Conversion to a viaduct began in 1873, originally as an 8-arch viaduct, which later became a 12-arch structure, listed under the design plans as bridge 117. The arches, which are built from coursed sandstone, were complete by May 1875, with the approach embankments finished two months later. The parapet was completed in September of the same year.

The structure is often called Dandry Mire, but it has been known as Moorcock Viaduct, and occasionally as Garsdale Viaduct, though Dandry Mire is more common than the other two. Some sources list the spelling as one word (Dandrymire), such as Ordnance Survey mapping, and typos are quite common (Dandy Mire). The name Dandry Mire, is first recorded in 1771.

Besides spanning Dandry Mire Moss, the viaduct also now spans the Pennine Bridleway between Garsdale railway station, and Moorcock Inn. The south side of the A684 road by Moorcock Inn is the site of the Dandry Mire camp, where stone-masons and navvies associated with constructing the viaduct (and other structures on this stretch of line) were housed. The viaduct was grade II listed in June 1984, and is recognised as being a prominent landmark at the head of Garsdale, where the watershed divides between the Rivers Clough, Eden and Ure.

Notes

See also
Arten Gill Viaduct
Ribblehead Viaduct

References

Sources

External links

Close up image of the datestone showing 1875
Drawing of the viaduct from 1877

Railway viaducts in Cumbria
Bridges completed in 1875
Grade II listed buildings in Cumbria
Grade II listed bridges
Viaducts in England